Nazim Kamran Choudhury is a Bangladesh Nationalist Party politician and a former Member of Parliament for constituency Sylhet-9.

Career
He is a former member of Parliament from Bangladesh Nationalist Party. He was elected from Sylhet. He was sued in 2007 for attempting to grab an apartment in Gulshan, Dhaka. He was arrested in 2009 by Bangladesh Police. He is the Managing Director at Nazimgarh Resorts in Sylhet.

Personal life
He is married to former adviser of Caretaker Government Geetiara Safya Chowdhury. He is the cousin of former Chief Advisor Fakhruddin Ahmed.

References

Bangladesh Nationalist Party politicians
Living people
Year of birth missing (living people)